GP 500 is a motorcycle racing simulation for the PC developed by Melbourne House and released in 1999 by Hasbro Interactive under the MicroProse label.
The full length title of this game is "GP 500: The Official FIM Road Racing World Championship Grand Prix Race Simulator".

Reception

The game, to this day is received as one of the best, if not the best MotoGP game on the market.

References

1999 video games
MicroProse games
Motorcycle video games
Racing video games
Racing simulators
Video games developed in Australia
Windows games
Windows-only games
Grand Prix motorcycle racing